Dasiglucagon, sold under the brand name Zegalogue, is a medication used to treat severe hypoglycemia in people with diabetes.

The most common side effects include nausea, vomiting, headache, diarrhea, and injection site pain.

Dasiglucagon was approved for medical use in the United States in March 2021. It was designated an orphan drug in August 2017.

Medical uses 
Dasiglucagon is indicated for the treatment of severe hypoglycemia in people aged six years of age and older with diabetes.

Contraindications 
Dasiglucagon is contraindicated in people with pheochromocytoma or insulinoma.

References

External links 
 
 
 
 

Anti-diabetic drugs
Orphan drugs